Sylvia M Platt (born 1951), is a female former swimmer who competed for England.

Swimming career
She represented England and won a silver medal in the 4 x 100 metres medley relay, at the 1970 British Commonwealth Games in Edinburgh, Scotland.

Platt represented the Hyde Seal Swimming Club.

References

1951 births
Living people
English female swimmers
Commonwealth Games medallists in swimming
Commonwealth Games silver medallists for England
Swimmers at the 1970 British Commonwealth Games
Medallists at the 1970 British Commonwealth Games